The Jasenica (Serbian Cyrillic: Јасеница) is a river in central Serbia. This river gives the name to the surrounding region.

Description 
The Jasenica originates from several streams, most notably the Đurinci (Cyrillic: Ђуринци) from Venčac mountain, and the Srebrenica (Cyrillic: Сребреница) from the northern slopes of the Rudnik mountain in central Serbia. At its origin, the river runs through the eastern border of the Kačer region. It flows to the southeast initially, curves around the Rudnik, passes the villages of Donja Šatornja, Blaznava and reaches Stragari, the northernmost municipality of the City of Kragujevac. The area is known as the geographical center of Serbia (near the village of Čumić).

The Jasenica turns north, then northeast south of Topola and, after the villages of Božurnja and Žabare, directly east. Near the village of Natalinci the Trnava (Cyrillic: Трнава) runs into it from the right and changes its direction once more, this time to the northeast. After Mramorac village, the Jasenica spills over in several parallel flows, which continue until its confluence.

After the Pridvorica and Vodice villages (on different arms of the river), the Jasenica reaches the town of Smederevska Palanka, the most populous settlement in its valley. This is also where the Kubršnica, its main tributary, flows into it from the left. The Jasenica then gently bends to the east, flowing into the Great Morava near the village of Veliko Orašje (the southern arm of the river flows through the town of Velika Plana).

The river is not navigable. Its name means the Ash tree river in Serbian.

Region 
The Jasenica region extends beyond the Jasenica river valley, encompassing the region bounded by the Rudnik, Venčac and Kosmaj mountains, and the valley of the Velika Morava. It divides in two sub-regions, lower Jasenica of Smederevska Palanka, and upper Jasenica of Kragujevac. It covers the valleys of the Jasenica, Kubršnica, Veliki Lug, Brestovica, Milatovica and other rivers. The Jablanica river itself delineates the eastern border of the region for the most part, dividing it from the Lepenica region. The region is densely populated, including several towns (Smederevska Palanka, Velika Plana, Aranđelovac, Mladenovac and Topola.)

See also 
 List of rivers of Serbia
 Jasenička

References 

 Mala Prosvetina Enciklopedija, Third edition (1985); Prosveta; 
 Jovan Đ. Marković (1990): Enciklopedijski geografski leksikon Jugoslavije; Svjetlost-Sarajevo; 

Rivers of Serbia
Šumadija